Thomas Fox Averill (born April 30, 1949) is a writer, novelist, and academic from Topeka, Kansas. His works, including Secrets of the Tsil Cafe, The Slow Air of Ewan Macpherson, Ordinary Genius, and, more recently Rode, have won wide acclaim in Kansas and throughout the United States.  He is a two-time winner of Kansas Notable Book Awards.

Averill is a writer-in-residence and professor of English at Topeka's Washburn University. Well known as a writer and teacher, Averill has published numerous works of fiction, short stories, and stories on his native Kansas and society at large.

References

External links
His website
 WU Professor writes novel

Writers from Topeka, Kansas
1949 births
Living people
American male novelists
21st-century American novelists
20th-century American novelists
20th-century American male writers
21st-century American male writers